Brothers from Another is the second studio album by American hip hop duo Young Gunz. It was released on May 24, 2005 via Roc-A-Fella Records. Production was handled by Chad Hamilton, Swizz Beatz, Boola, Bangladesh and Kanye West, with Jay-Z serving as executive producer. It features guest appearances from Pooda Brown, 112, Daz Dillinger, John Legend, Kanye West and Memphis Bleek.

The album peaked at number fifteen on the Billboard 200 and number four on the Top R&B/Hip-Hop Albums. By 2010, it sold 138,000 units in the US. Its lead single "Set It Off" peaked at number 52 on the Hot R&B/Hip-Hop Songs.

Track listing

Charts

References

External links

2005 albums
Young Gunz albums
Roc-A-Fella Records albums
Albums produced by Kanye West
Albums produced by Swizz Beatz
Albums produced by Bangladesh (record producer)